Edward Adolph Hoffman (November 30, 1893 – May 19, 1947) was a Major League Baseball third baseman who played for one season. He played in nine games for the Cleveland Indians during the 1915 Cleveland Indians season. His minor league career lasted through 1935, after which he managed in the minor leagues from 1935–1937 for the Tallahassee, Florida team in the Georgia–Florida League.

External links

1893 births
1947 deaths
Cleveland Indians players
Major League Baseball third basemen
Minor league baseball managers
Chattanooga Lookouts players
Charleston Sea Gulls players
Flint Vehicles players
Cleveland Spiders (minor league) players
Toledo Iron Men players
Springfield Reapers players
San Antonio Bronchos players
South Bend Benders players
Peoria Distillers players
Fort Wayne Chiefs players
Waco Navigators players
Fort Worth Panthers players
New Orleans Pelicans (baseball) players
Shreveport Sports players
Selma Selmians players
Albany Nuts players
Macon Peaches players
Mobile Bears players
Canton Terriers players
Springfield Senators players
Terre Haute Tots players
Baton Rouge Standards players
Tallahassee Capitals players